Wolson is a surname. Notable people with the surname include:

Chon Wolson (born 1959), Japanese soprano opera singer
Joshua Wolson (born 1974), American lawyer

See also
Colson
Olson (surname)
Polson (surname)
Wolfson